Blues Bureau International is an American guitar oriented, blues, and blues rock independent record label.

Blues Bureau is a member of Mike Varney's Shrapnel Label Group, which also includes Shrapnel Records, another guitar oriented label which features shred guitar, hard rock, metal and progressive metal, and Tone Center Records, a jazz oriented label featuring "fusion guitar" as well as a number of jazz tributes.

Blues Bureau artists include Rick Derringer, Eric Gales, Marc Ford, Chris Duarte, Leslie West and Pat Travers. The Blues Bureau catalog is a reflection of Mr. Varney's desire to provide a platform for talented young blues guitarists, and to allow established artists to pursue their artistic vision.

Notable releases
Eric Gales - Relentless (2010)
Marc Ford - Weary and Wired(2007)
Joe Louis Walker - New Direction (2004)
Leslie West - Got Blooze (2005)
Chris Duarte - Blue Velocity (2007)
Jimi Kidd/Paul Gilbert - Raw Blues Power (2001)
Glenn Hughes - Blues L.A. Authority Volume II (1992–93)
Rick Derringer - Back to the Blues (1993)
Pat Travers - Just A Touch (1993)
Outlaws - Hittin' The Road Live! (1993)
Outlaws - Diablo Canyon (1994)
Jon Butcher - Positively the Blues (1995)
Marc Ford & The Neptune Blues Club - Marc Ford & The Neptune Blues Club (2008)

References

External links
The Shrapnel Label Group
Shrapnel Records Official MySpace Site
Producer Profile: Mike Varney

Blues record labels